The 1995 Brighton International was a women's tennis tournament played on indoor carpet courts at the Brighton Centre in Brighton, England that was part of the Tier II of the 1995 WTA Tour. It was the 18th, and last, edition of the tournament and was held from 17 October until 22 October 1995. Fourth-seeded Mary Joe Fernández, who entered on a wildcard, won the singles title at the event and earned $79,000 first-prize money.

Finals

Singles
 Mary Joe Fernández defeated  Amanda Coetzer 6–4, 7–5
 It was Fernández' 2nd singles title of the year and the 6th of her career.

Doubles

 Meredith McGrath /  Larisa Savchenko defeated  Lori McNeil /  Helena Suková 7–5, 6–1

Prize money

References

External links
 International Tennis Federation (ITF) tournament event details
 Tournament draws

Brighton International
Brighton International
Brighton International
Brighton International
Brighton
Bright